Black Sand Basin is one of a grouping of geothermal hot springs and geysers located in the Upper Geyser Basin of Yellowstone National Park, Wyoming. The spring is too hot to use as a mineral bath as its scalding  or hotter water has proven to be fatal.  In the winter, a marked ski trail runs from the Old Faithful Visitor Center to Black Sand Basin

Geography
The area is named for its obsidian black sand that covers much of the basin. Hot springs in the Black Sand Basin are Emerald Pool , Rainbow Pool , Sunset Lake , Opalescent Pool  and Green Spring. Cliff Geyser  and Spouter Geyser  are also located in the basin, alongside Iron Spring creek. The basin is located at the base of Rhyolite Cliffs.

History
Black Sand Basin was originally called the Emerald Group, a name given to it by A. C. Peale in 1878 but tourists started calling it Black Sand Basin and that name stuck. The main draw of the basin used to be "Handkerchief Pool", people would drop a handkerchief in the pool, currents would carry it away, and after a short time it would rise back to the surface, freshly cleaned.

Gallery

See also

 Geothermal areas of Yellowstone
 List of hot springs in the United States
 List of hot springs in the world

References

Hot springs of Wyoming
Yellowstone National Park